Paul Anthony Jones (born 9 September 1965) is an English former footballer who played as a midfielder in the Football League for Walsall and Wolverhampton Wanderers.

Career
Jones joined Walsall in 1981 as an apprentice, before signing professional forms in September 1983. He played 143 games in the league for the club before leaving in November 1989 to join Second Division side Wolverhampton Wanderers.

The midfielder made fifteen appearances in total for Wolves before being released in 1991, after which he entered non-league football, initially with Kettering Town.

References

1965 births
Living people
Sportspeople from Walsall
English footballers
Walsall F.C. players
Wolverhampton Wanderers F.C. players
Wrexham A.F.C. players
English Football League players
Kettering Town F.C. players
Association football midfielders